A patent caveat, often shortened to caveat, was a legal document filed with the United States Patent Office.

History
Caveats were instituted by the U.S. Patent Act of 1836, but were discontinued in 1909, with the U.S. Congress abolishing the system formally in 1910. A caveat was similar to a patent application with a description of an invention and drawings, but without examination for patentable subject matter and without a requirement for patent claims.  A patent caveat was an official notice of intention to file a patent application at a later date.  A caveat expired after one year, but could be renewed by paying an annual fee of $10.

Caveats were similar to provisional applications used today in the United States Patent and Trademark Office (USPTO) which also expire after one year.  However, provisional applications today are non-renewable under any circumstances.

According to the Guide to the Practice of the Patent Office 1853, the primary objective of a caveat was to prevent the issuing of a rival patent for the same invention to a subsequent inventor.  Before the issuing of a patent, the caveats filed within the preceding year were searched.  If one was found for the same invention as the proposed patent, the Patent Office notified the holder of the caveat, who then had three months to submit a formal patent application with claims.  If the two patent applications claimed the same invention, an interference would then be declared and neither patent could be issued until it was determined which was the first to invent.

Famous examples
Perhaps the most famous example of such a conflict was on 14 February 1876, when Elisha Gray filed a patent caveat and Alexander Graham Bell filed a patent application on the same day, both relating to the telephone. Gray ended up abandoning his patent caveat, but the case was extremely controversial and continued in the courts for many years.  A deaf patent examiner (Bell was well known for his work with the deaf and had a deaf wife) had met with Bell on the matter, and a handwritten marginal note including one of Gray's critical technical innovations appeared on Bell's patent, which had not been there on the original filing.

This case contributed to the perception that patent caveats were potential leaks of valuable inventions to other applicants with friends in the Patent Office, without providing a solid legal recourse when confidentiality of the caveat was so abused.  Gray did eventually win a judgement in a US court vindicating his claims, but long after:  Bell was forever after known as inventor of the telephone. See the articles on Gray and Bell for details.

Cost
The filing fee of $10 for a caveat was less costly than the filing fee $15 for a full patent application.  As stated by the USPTO: "In 1861, the fee for obtaining a full patent was $35, of which $15 was to be paid at the time of application and $20 when the patent was granted. In 1922, the patent filing fee increased from $15 to $20." However the patent caveat fee remained $10 per year until the caveat system was abolished.

See also 

 Patent model
 Patent Office 1836 fire
 Patent Office 1877 fire
 United States Defensive Publication
 United States Statutory Invention Registration

Notes

References

External links 
 Elisha Gray's telephone caveat drawing
 

Caveat, patent